Below are the squads for the 2012 AFF Championship, co-hosted by Malaysia and Thailand, which took place between 24 November and 22 December 2012. The player's total caps, their club teams and age are as of 24 November 2012, the tournament's opening day. Players marked (c) were named as captain for their national team for the tournament.

Group A

Thailand
Coach:  Winfried Schäfer

Vietnam
Coach: Phan Thanh Hùng

Philippines
Coach:  Michael Weiß

Myanmar
Coach:  Park Sung-Hwa

Group B

Malaysia
Coach: Datuk K. Rajagopal

Indonesia
Coach: Nilmaizar

Singapore
Coach:  Radojko Avramović

Laos
Coach:  Kokichi Kimura

Statistics

Player representation by league system

References

AFF Championship squads
Squads